Ferenc Szálasiné (née Gizella Lutz or Lucz; 21 October 1906 – 26 September 1992) was the longtime companion and, for a brief time, wife, of Ferenc Szálasi who served as Leader of the Hungarian Nation and de facto Prime Minister of Hungary at the end of the Second World War. They were married on 29 April 1945, on the wedding day of Adolf Hitler and Eva Braun. She was captured by the United States Army on 3 July 1945 and transferred to Hungary. Her husband was executed on 12 March 1946. She was sentenced to twelve years imprisonment on 3 December 1953. She was released in 1958.

Gizella Lutz was interviewed about her husband and their relation in 1989. She was asked whether she believed in Szálasi, to which she answered: "Of course I did, because the woman ought to believe in whom she loves." Contrary to her statement, Ferenc Szálasiné made his role as husband less of a priority to fulfill his political responsibilities.

See also
 Eva Braun
 Clara Petacci

References

Further reading
 Virtus.hu - Az utolsó Nagyasszony: Lutz Gizella dead link

1906 births
1992 deaths
First ladies of Hungary